The 1979–80 DFB-Pokal was the 37th season of the annual German football cup competition. It began on 24 August 1979 and ended on 4 June 1980. 128 teams competed in the tournament of seven rounds. In the final Fortuna Düsseldorf defeated 1. FC Köln 2–1 to defend their title from the preceding season.

Matches

First round

Replays

Second round

Replays

Third round

Replays

Round of 16

Quarter-finals

Semi-finals

Final

References

External links
 Official site of the DFB 
 Kicker.de 

1979-80
1979–80 in German football cups